Crown Metal Products was a manufacturer of railroad rolling stock based in Wyano, Pennsylvania. The company was founded by Ken Williams in 1946 and initially sold pot cleaners and then electric fence wires and other products. In 1959, the company began to transition into producing narrow gauge locomotives, a personal interest of Williams. The company went on to produce steam locomotives and passenger cars of various sizes for amusement park railroads. The firm ceased production in 1989; however, much of its rolling stock continues to operate at various locations around the world.

Background
The firm has its roots in 1946, when Ken Williams, a machinist and railway enthusiast of Wyano, Pennsylvania, founded Crown Metal Products in Sutersville, Pennsylvania to produce pot cleaners. In the 1950s, Williams purchased a miniature steam locomotive, presumed to have been built by the Cagney Bros., and decided to construct his own locomotive of the same design. In the summer of 1959, Williams was visited by Gaylon and Sallie Borders of Flora, Illinois, who had taken an interest in his locomotive. Gaylon then placed an order for a locomotive of Williams' design, which would become the first locomotive to be built by the Crown Metal Products. This locomotive was given the name "Little Toot", and over the following decade, more locomotives would be produced for parks, zoos, and other amusement attractions.

Designs

The locomotives produced by Crown were narrow gauge live steam locomotives of various sizes, ranging from  gauge to  gauge. All locomotives built were of the 4-4-0 wheel arrangement, with the exception of Carowinds locomotive no. 1 "Melodia", a 2-6-2 rebuilt from a 0-6-2T built by Porter in 1897. Most locomotives were styled after the typical American 4-4-0 type locomotives of the mid 19th century, with most having two domes, similar to the Jupiter locomotive, The General, and the Inyo. However, some of the  gauge offerings featured three domes in the vein of locomotives such as the William Crooks and the Countess of Dufferin. The locomotives were built to burn coal or wood as fuel, though many were later converted to propane or compressed air. Busch Gardens Williamsburg purchased two  gauge locomotives that, while built to the same specifications as the typical Crown offerings, were given European style appearances. Similarly, their sister park in Tampa bought two locomotives of the same size, these having African styling.

Crown also constructed the open-air excursion coaches that were usually provided with the locomotives sold, as well as a set of standard gauge excursion coaches for the Greenfield Village's Weiser Railroad.

Decline

By the 1980s, tighter Federal Railroad Administration regulations for operating steam locomotives, the inherent dangers of boiler failures, as well as the significant amount of work required to keep steam locomotives maintained on a daily basis, resulted in the Crown locomotives falling out of favor, with more parks opting for diesel locomotives or steam-outlines (locomotives powered by diesel or gasoline locomotives but given the outward appearance of a steam locomotive) for their railways. The most popular steam-outline locomotive is the  gauge replica of the C.P. Huntington locomotive produced by Chance Rides, which continues to be produced for park railways around the world. Crown Metal Products was shut down in 1989, with all remaining orders fulfilled by 1990.

Ken's son, Bert Williams, continued to support the Crown locomotives, providing replacement parts and service through his company, Castle Ridge Products of Claysville, Pennsylvania, until 2004. That year, the necessary tooling, jigs, inventory and rights were purchased by Tweetsie Railroad in Blowing Rock, North Carolina. Tweetsie Railroad currently handles parts, restoration and service of Crown locomotives.

List of Crown Metal locomotives
A large number of Crown-built locomotives continue to operate at amusement parks, recreational parks, and tourist railways. Below is a partial listing of parks that currently operate, or previously operated, Crown locomotives:

See also

List of locomotive builders

References

Back in the 70's, Crown Metal Products Company purchased the patent and manufacture of steam locomotive air brake equipment from Westinghouse Air Brake Company (now WABTEC) of Wilmerding, Pa., U.S.A. As main railroad steam locomotives were superseded by diesel units, Crown Metal Products could only sell this equipment abroad. Such was the case of a large order placed by Argentine State Railroads which then amounted to some $ 440,000.00, covering compressor and air brake equipment spare parts, the largest order received by Crown at that time.

External links

Unofficial Crown Fansite
Matt Conrad's Park Train Information Page
Surviving Steam Locomotive Search - Crown Metal Products

Amusement ride manufacturers
Defunct locomotive manufacturers of the United States